Roznowa may refer to the following places in Poland:
Rożnowa, Lesser Poland Voivodeship (south Poland)
Różnowa, Greater Poland Voivodeship (west-central Poland)